Per Schwenzen (3 February 1899 – 4 November 1984) was a Norwegian writer who settled in Germany. Schwenzen wrote a number of screenplays, plays and librettos for operettas. His play In the Skies of Europe, advocating Franco-German reconciliation, was widely performed in 1933.

Selected filmography 
 Family Parade (1936)
 Autobus S (1937)
 Counterfeiters (1940)
 The Swedish Nightingale (1941)
 Gabriele Dambrone (1943)
 When the Young Wine Blossoms (1943)
 The Molander Case (1945)
 Professor Nachtfalter (1951)
 Captain Bay-Bay (1953)
 Jonny Saves Nebrador (1953)
 Men at a Dangerous Age (1954)
 Ten on Every Finger (1954)
 Guitars of Love (1954)
 As Long as There Are Pretty Girls (1955)
 The Major and the Bulls (1955)
 I Often Think of Piroschka (1955)
 The Mad Bomberg (1957)
 A Woman Who Knows What She Wants (1958)
 The Blue Sea and You (1959)
 Hula-Hopp, Conny (1959)
 Heritage of Bjorndal (1960)
 The Cry of the Wild Geese (1961)

References

External links 
 

1899 births
1984 deaths
Norwegian screenwriters
People from Moss, Norway
Norwegian emigrants to Germany
20th-century screenwriters